Swartzville is an unincorporated community and census-designated place (CDP) in East Cocalico Township, Lancaster County, Pennsylvania, United States. As of the 2010 census the population was 2,283.

Geography
Swartzville is in northeastern Lancaster County, in the northeast part of East Cocalico Township. It is bordered to the northeast by the borough of Adamstown, to the southeast by the U.S. Route 222 freeway, and to the southwest by Interstate 76, the Pennsylvania Turnpike. Pennsylvania Route 272 (North Reading Road) passes through the community, leading northeast through Adamstown  to US-222 and southwest  to Ephrata. Pennsylvania Route 897 (Swartzville Road) crosses PA 272 in the center of Swartzville, leading northwest  to Reinholds and south  to Terre Hill.

The west side of Swartzville drains via Stony Run to Cocalico Creek, and the east side drains to Little Muddy Creek, a tributary of Muddy Creek. Cocalico and Muddy creeks both flow southwest to the Conestoga River, part of the Susquehanna River watershed.

References

Census-designated places in Lancaster County, Pennsylvania
Census-designated places in Pennsylvania